Oroville (Oro, Spanish for "Gold" and Ville, French for "town") is the county seat of Butte County, California, United States. The population of the city was 15,506 at the 2010 census, up from 13,004 in the 2000 census. Following the 2018 Camp Fire that destroyed much of the town of Paradise, the population of Oroville increased as many people who lost their homes relocated to nearby Oroville. In 2020, the 2020 census recorded the population of Oroville at 20,042.

Oroville is considered the gateway to Lake Oroville and Feather River recreational areas. The Berry Creek Rancheria of Maidu Indians of California is headquartered in Oroville.

Oroville is located adjacent to State Route 70, and is in close proximity to State Route 99, which connects Butte County with Interstate 5. The city of Chico is located about 23 miles (38 kilometers) northwest of the city, and the state capital of Sacramento lies around 70 miles (112 kilometers) to the south.

Oroville's nickname is the "City of Gold", basically just the Spanish name of the city in English. Oroville has also been declared a Tree City USA for 41 years by the National Arbor Day Foundation.

History
Oroville is situated at the base of the foothills on the banks of the Feather River where it flows out of the Sierra Nevada onto the flat floor of the Sacramento Valley. It was established as the home base of navigation on the Feather River to supply gold miners during the California Gold Rush.

The town was originally named "Ophir City", but was later changed to Oroville when the first post office opened in 1854 (oro  is the Spanish word for 'gold'). The City of Oroville was incorporated on January 3, 1906.

Gold was found at Bidwell Bar, one of the first gold mining sites in California, bringing thousands of prospectors to the Oroville area seeking riches. Now inundated by the waters of enormous Lake Oroville, which was filled in 1968, Bidwell Bar is memorialized by the Bidwell Bar Bridge, an original remnant from the area and the first suspension bridge in California (California Historical Landmark #314). In the early 20th century, the Western Pacific Railroad completed construction of the all-weather Feather River Canyon route through the Sierra Nevada giving it the nickname of "The Feather River Route". Oroville station would serve as an important stop for the California Zephyr during its 20-year run. In 1983, this became a part of the Union Pacific Railroad as their Feather River Canyon Subdivision. A major highway, State Route 70, roughly parallels the railroad line winding through the canyon.

The Chinese Temple (CHL No. 770 and listed on the National Register of Historic Places) is another monument to Oroville's storied past. Chinese laborers from the pioneer era established the Temple as a place of worship for followers of Chinese Popular Religion and the three major Chinese religions: Taoism, Buddhism, and Confucianism. The Chinese Temple and Garden, as it is now called, has an extensive collection of artifacts and a serene garden to enjoy.

The olive-canning industry was founded in Oroville by Freda Ehmann, the "mother of ripe olives". She built a large cannery in Oroville, and by 1900 was the president of the world's largest canned olive factory. Ehmann was a believer in women's suffrage and a friend of Susan B. Anthony

Ishi, Oroville's most famous resident, was the last of the Yahi people and is considered the last "Stone Age" Indian to come out of the wilderness and into Western civilization. When he appeared out of the hills in East Oroville in 1911, he was immediately thrust into the national spotlight. The Visitor's Center at Lake Oroville has a thorough exhibit and documentary film on Ishi and his life in society.

Archaeological finds place the northwestern border for the prehistoric Martis people in the Oroville area.

1881 lynching
On August 7, 1881, pioneer Jack Crum was allegedly stomped to death by local bully Tom Noacks in Chico, California. The young Noacks was feared by the locals of Butte County, not only because of his size and strength, but allegedly because he was mentally unbalanced and enjoyed punching oxen in the head.

Noacks was arrested and jailed in the Chico jail.  Once word got out that the old pioneer had been murdered, the authorities moved Noacks to the Butte County county jail in Oroville for his safety. Crum's friends, knowing that Noacks was in the county jail, made their way to Oroville with rope in hand. Knocking on the jail door, the men told the jailer that they had a prisoner from the town of Biggs, California. Once inside the jail, they overpowered the jailer and dragged Noacks from his cell. They took Noacks to Crum's former farm and hanged him from an old cottonwood tree. Nobody was ever prosecuted for the lynching.

Hate groups
Hate groups began appearing in Oroville media stories beginning in 1976 with a neo-Nazi husband and wife couple killed in a shootout. In 1980, members of the American Nazi Party moved to Oroville from Tracy, California, to re-organize as Chico Area National Socialists. In September 1982, 17-year-old Joseph Hoover was murdered by his Nazi colleagues after he told police he helped spread anti-Black hate literature at Oroville High School. One thousand people marched in Oroville in protest of Nazi and Ku Klux Klan activity on December 11, 1982. Local Nazi leader Perry "Red" Wartham was convicted of Hoover's murder and sentenced to 27 years, and two more male high school–age Nazi recruits were convicted as accessories to murder. In 2016, an Oroville man was found spreading Nazi hate messages in Sacramento. In January 2004, a white power publication was distributed in the Kelly Ridge area south of Oroville.

Oroville Dam crisis
On February 7, 2017, after heavy rains, a defect formed in a spillway of Oroville Dam. For the first time since its construction, the secondary spillway was overtopped on February 11. Shortly after being put into service, this structure began to show signs of being undermined, raising fears of catastrophic failure. Owing to their inability to predict the continued safety of this spillway, the Butte County Sheriff ordered evacuations of downstream residents from Butte, Sutter, and Yuba counties.

Camp Fire
In November 2018, Oroville was threatened by the Camp Fire.

COVID-19
In November 2021, citing alleged federal and state overreach during the COVID-19 pandemic, the Oroville city council passed a resolution declaring the city as its own "Constitutional Republic" and refused to enforce federal orders that it said violated its citizens' rights.

The resolution to declare the town a constitutional republic was an attempt to limit state and federal restrictions related to the COVID-19 pandemic in California. One rural law expert stated that the designation was unclear and would not operate to shield the city from following state and federal laws.

Geography

Oroville is situated at the head of navigation on the Feather River. The Yuba River flows into the Feather River near Marysville, California and these flow together to the Sacramento River. Geologically, Oroville is situated at the meeting place of three provinces: the Central Valley alluvial plain to the west, the crystalline Sierra Nevada to the SE and the volcanic Cascade Mountains to the north. It has a Mediterranean climate.

Oroville sits on the eastern rim of the Great Valley, defined today by the floodplains of the Sacramento River and its tributaries. Around Oroville these sediments are dominated by thick fans of Feather River sediments, but just east of this there is a thin, N–S band of late Cretaceous sediments. These sit on top of the Sierran basement, which beneath eastern Oroville comprise greenschist-facies metavolcanic rocks of Jurassic age, giving way to granites of the Sierra batholith to the east. These are manifestations of a vigorous island arc sequence, built out over an east-dipping subduction zone of mid-to-late Mesozoic age. The gold veins lace this ancient arc, remobilized by Mesozoic shearing and intrusions of igneous rock. The crystalline foothills are locally overlain by a Cenozoic sequence of Eocene clean beach sands overlain by Neogene volcanics, including the Diamond Head-like profile of "Table Mountain".

Climate
According to the Köppen Climate Classification system, Oroville has a warm-summer Mediterranean climate, abbreviated "Csa" on climate maps.

According to US climate data, on the average Oroville receives  of precipitation per year, which is about 20% less than the national average, but somewhat higher than the average California rainfall total.

Demographics

2010
The 2010 United States Census The racial makeup was 11,686 (75.2%) White, 453 (2.9%) African American, 573 (3.7%) Native American, 1,238 (8.0%) Asian, 56 (0.4%) Pacific Islander, 554 (3.6%) from other races, and 986 (6.3%) from two or more races. Hispanic or Latino of any race were 1,945 persons (12.5%).

The Census reported that 14,662 people (94.3% of the population) lived in households, 72 (0.5%) lived in non-institutionalized group quarters, and 812 (5.2%) were institutionalized.

There were 5,646 households, out of which 2,126 (37.7%) had children under the age of 18 living in them, 1,893 (33.5%) were opposite-sex married couples living together, 1,174 (20.8%) had a female householder with no husband present, 430 (7.6%) had a male householder with no wife present. There were 615 (10.9%) unmarried opposite-sex partnerships, and 33 (0.6%) same-sex married couples or partnerships. 1,699 households (30.1%) were made up of individuals, and 718 (12.7%) had someone living alone who was 65 years of age or older. The average household size was 2.60. There were 3,497 families (61.9% of all households); the average family size was 3.22.

The population was spread out, with 4,267 people (27.4%) under the age of 18, 1,969 people (12.7%) aged 18 to 24, 3,940 people (25.3%) aged 25 to 44, 3,417 people (22.0%) aged 45 to 64, and 1,953 people (12.6%) who were 65 years of age or older. The median age was 31.5 years. For every 100 females, there were 93.7 males. For every 100 females age 18 and over, there were 91.8 males.

The homeowner vacancy rate was 3.6%; the rental vacancy rate was 8.4%. 6,293 people (40.5% of the population) lived in owner-occupied housing units and 8,369 people (53.8%) lived in rental housing units.

2000
As of the census of 2000, there were 13,004 people, 4,881 households, and 2,948 families residing in the city. The racial makeup of the city was 77.2% White, 4.0% Black or African American, 3.9% Native American, 6.3% Asian, 0.3% Pacific Islander, 2.8% from other races, and 5.4% from two or more races. 8.3% of the population were Hispanic or Latino of any race.

There were 4,881 households, out of which 33.9% had children under the age of 18 living with them, 36.4% were married couples living together, 18.9% had a female householder with no husband present, and 39.6% were non-families. 33.2% of all households were made up of individuals, and 14.5% had someone living alone who was 65 years of age or older. The average household size was 2.50 and the average family size was 3.19.

In the city, the population was spread out, with 30.1% under the age of 18, 10.3% from 18 to 24, 25.8% from 25 to 44, 19.2% from 45 to 64, and 14.7% who were 65 years of age or older. The median age was 33 years. For every 100 females, there were 95.8 males. For every 100 females age 18 and over, there were 90.7 males.

The median income for a household in the city was $21,911, and the median income for a family was $27,666. Males had a median income of $28,587 versus $21,916 for females. The per capita income for the city was $12,345. About 16.2% of families and 23.1% of the population were below the poverty line, including 39.3% of those under age 18 and 8.9% of those age 65 or over.

Oroville is home to a considerable number of ethnic Hmong. The Hmong migrated from Southeast Asia, especially from the country Laos, after the Vietnam War. The Hmong were allies of the American forces during the Vietnam War, many were recruited to help fight the Communist-aligned North Vietnamese forces in Laos and Vietnam. The Hmong people were given blanket political asylum after the fall of Saigon to the NVA in 1975. Every year there is an annual festival during autumn which was originally a harvest festival but now called the New Year celebration. In 2010, 773 people of Hmong descent lived in the city of Oroville, 726 in South Oroville, 640 in Thermalito, and 140 in Oroville East. In 2010, the Oroville/Chico Hmong community was the 9th largest in the Western US.

In the 1950s, a community of Romanians migrated from Europe, with 560 remaining at the time of the 2010 census.

Native Americans made up 3.7% of Oroville's population in 2010. The largest tribal group is the local Maidu. The Berry Creek Rancheria of Maidu Indians of California is headquartered in Oroville, with 306 members. The world's largest museum of Maidu culture is located in Oroville East, at the Lookout Museum.

Economy
The economy of Oroville is largely driven by tourism to Lake Oroville and the Feather River recreation areas. The largest industries in Oroville as of 2017 are: Healthcare and Social Assistance (20%), Retail Trade (11%), and Accommodation and Food Service (10%).

As the neighboring city of Chico experiences growth in retail, education, and technology industries, Oroville has experienced population growth associated with commuters attracted to lower property costs, and a smaller cost of living. Recently, Oroville has seen an increase in economic development. Oroville Hospital announced in 2018 a hospital expansion, and in 2019 received $200 million in bonds for a five-story hospital tower expected to be competed in 2022. Notable retailers who have expanded to Oroville in the past few years include: Ross Dress For Less, Marshalls, Starbucks, and Chipotle Mexican Grill.

Top employers
According to the city's 2020–2021 Annual Comprehensive Financial Report, the top employers in the city are:

Tourism

 The Oroville Dam is the tallest dam in the US and one of the 20 largest dams in the world.
Lake Oroville is a man-made lake that was formed by the Oroville Dam. Lake Oroville features an abundance of camping, picnicking, horseback riding, hiking, sail and power boating, water-skiing, fishing, swimming, boat-in camping, floating campsites, and horse camping.
Lake Oroville Visitor Center is located in Kelly Ridge and overlooks the Oroville Dam and Lake Oroville. The visitor center is home to a museum with interpretive displays, the history of the dam and the State Water Project. A  viewing tower allows the visitor the opportunity to have a panoramic view of the lake and surrounding areas.
 Mother Orange Tree, located in Oroville, is the oldest of all Northern California orange trees.
 The Feather River Fish Hatchery raise Chinook salmon and steelhead along the Feather River. The annual Oroville Salmon Festival is held on the fourth Saturday of September at both the Hatchery and downtown Oroville.
 Riverbend Park is a  park on the Feather River established in 2006. The river features boat access and fishing. Other available activies include disc golf, running and walking trails, a river beach, and water fountains to play in on hot days.
 Brad Freeman Bike Trail – a  bike trail running along the Feather River up to the dam, down through the city then out to the Thermalito Forebay and Afterbay.
 Oroville Chinese Temple – built in 1863 by members of the Chinese Popular Religion.
The Oroville Municipal Airport is located south of State Route 162 west of State Route 70.

Parks and recreation 
Oroville has several parks featuring playgrounds, picnic tables and benches.

Parks and trails

Parks 
 Riverbend Park
 Bedrock Park
 The C.F. Lott Home in Sank Park – A Victorian revival home built in 1856 by "Judge" Lott. Sank Park, a lush shaded garden with a gazebo, encompasses an entire city block that Judge Lott bought in 1855 for $200
 Hammon Park
 Hewitt Park
 Rotary Park
 Martin Luther King Jr. Park
 Playtown USA Park
 Gary Nolan Baseball Complex (Mitchell Field)
 Nelson Sports Complex
 Centennial Park

Trails 
 Feather River Bike Trail
 Brad Freeman Trail
 Dan Beebe Trail
 North Table Mountain Ecological Reserve
 Kelly Ridge Recreation Area

Education
The Oroville Union High School District includes all of the greater Oroville area, including many neighborhoods that are not within the city limits of Oroville. The District includes two traditional high schools, Las Plumas High School and Oroville High School, and Prospect High School, which functions as a continuation/remedial high school. The city also has an adult school, Oroville Adult School.

Several small, rural school districts are in the surrounding areas.

Oroville City Elementary School District

Elementary schools
Oakdale Heights Elementary
Ophir Elementary
Stanford Avenue Elementary
Wyandotte Avenue Elementary
STREAM Charter School
Helen Wilcox Elementary School
Golden Hills Elementary
Stockton Elementary

Middle schools
Central Middle School
Ishi Hills Middle School
Palermo Middle School
Nelson Ave Middle School

Oroville Union High School District

High schools
Oroville High School
Las Plumas High School
Prospect High School

Higher education
 Oroville Adult School
Butte Community College
Northwest Lineman College

Media
Oroville is home to KOYO-LP, a low-power community radio station owned and operated by the Bird Street Arbor Day Media Project. The station was built by numerous volunteers from Oroville and around the region in April 2002 at the second Prometheus Radio Project barnraising. KOYO-LP broadcasts music, news, and public affairs to listeners at 107.1FM.

Infrastructure

Hospital 
Oroville Hospital is a general acute care hospital and offers basic emergency care located in the City of Oroville.

Fire department 

Superfund sites
Oroville has three designated superfund cleanup sites, two of which have been cleaned up and delisted: a Koppers Co. wood treatment plant, a Louisiana Pacific sawmill, and the Western Pacific railyard.

The Koppers Co. plant was listed on September 21, 1984, for pentachlorophenol (PCP), dioxin, furan, polycyclic aromatic hydrocarbon (PAH), and heavy metals (copper, chromium, and arsenic) contamination due to chemicals spilled on unpaved areas.

The Louisiana-Pacific sawmill was listed on June 10, 1986, for pentachlorophenol PCP, dioxin, furan, heavy metals (arsenic, boron, and copper), and polycyclic aromatic hydrocarbon (PAH) contamination. Following remediation, the site was delisted on November 21, 1996. The sawmill was shut down in 2001.

The Western Pacific Railroad yard was listed on August 30, 1990, for volatile organic compound (VOC) and heavy metals (arsenic, lead, and chromium) contamination. Following remediation, the site was delisted on August 29, 2001.

Notable people
 Isaac Austin, professional basketball player
 Kevin Brown, professional baseball player for Milwaukee Brewers in early 1990s
 Ishi, last surviving member of Yahi Native American Tribe
 Hartford H Keifer (1902–1986), authority on eriophyid mites
 Edward Abraham Kusel, photographer
 Doug LaMalfa, U.S. Representative of California's 1st congressional district
 Marilyn Nash, actress and casting director
 Gary Nolan, professional baseball player
 John Spence, first American combat frogman
 Adolphus Frederic St. Sure, federal judge
 Kendall Thomas, Nash Professor of Law and a co-founder of the Center for the Study of Law and Culture at Columbia Law School
 Frank Tuttle, contemporary Native American artist
 Robert H. Young, Korean War Medal of Honor recipient
 Hubert Zemke, pilot

In popular culture
In the early 1970s, the movie The Klansman was filmed in Oroville.

Sister cities
 – Salem, Massachusetts (United States) 2007

References

External links

 
Cities in Butte County, California
County seats in California
Incorporated cities and towns in California
Superfund sites in California
1906 establishments in California